J. & P. Coats was an American soccer club founded in 1900 as the team of the Pawtucket, Rhode Island branch of the J. & P. Coats threadmaking company of Paisley, Scotland (following a 1952 merger this firm became part of the Coats Group).

The club played won the Rhode Island League in 1914 then was an inaugural member of the semi-pro Southern New England Soccer League. The club then joined the professional American Soccer League as an inaugural member.

After the first half of the 1928/29 season, the team ran into financial trouble and was bought by new management. The new owners renamed the team the Pawtucket Rangers.

The club left the original ASL sometime after the 1932 fall season and joined the New England Division of the new ASL that was formed in 1933/34.

The team won the Times Cup in 1919.

Year-by-year

Defunct soccer clubs in Rhode Island
American Soccer League (1921–1933) teams
Pawtucket, Rhode Island
1900 establishments in Rhode Island